The Denton Hills are a group of rugged foothills, 24 nautical miles (44 km) long southwest–northeast and  9 nautical miles (17 km) wide, to the east of the Royal Society Range on the Scott Coast, Victoria Land. The feature comprises a series of eastward-trending ridges and valleys circumscribed by Howchin Glacier, Armitage Saddle, Blue Glacier, the coast, and Walcott Bay. The principal glaciers (Hobbs, Blackwelder, Salmon, Garwood, Joyce, Rivard, Miers, Adams, Ward) flow east but have receded, leaving several dry valleys.

The Denton Hills were discovered and roughly mapped by the British National Antarctic Expedition, 1901–04, under R.F. Scott. The hills were mapped in detail by United States Antarctic Research Program and New Zealand Antarctic Research Programme personnel in the years following the International Geophysical Year, 1957–58. The hills were named by the Advisory Committee on Antarctic Names (1999) after Professor George H. Denton of the Department of Geological Sciences and the Institute for Quaternary Studies, University of Maine, who conducted geological research in the Transantarctic Mountains and Victoria Land (including work in these hills), 1958–99, making more than 25 visits to Antarctica. Denton Glacier is also named after him.

See also
Davison Peak

References

Hills of Victoria Land
Scott Coast